Harald Reinkind (born 17 August 1992) is a Norwegian handball player for THW Kiel and the Norwegian national team.

He participated at the 2019 World Men's Handball Championship.

Honours
World Championship:
: 2019
 European Championship:
: 2020
  EHF Champions League:
: 2020
  EHF Cup:
: 2019
German Championship:
: 2016, 2017, 2020, 2021
DHB-Pokal:
: 2018, 2019, 2022
DHB-Supercup
: 2016, 2017, 2020

References

External links
 
 
 Harald Reinkind at the Norwegian Handball Federation 
 
 

1992 births
Living people
Norwegian male handball players
Sportspeople from Tønsberg
Expatriate handball players
Norwegian expatriate sportspeople in Germany
Handball-Bundesliga players
Rhein-Neckar Löwen players
THW Kiel players
Handball players at the 2020 Summer Olympics
Olympic handball players of Norway